Wilhelmstein is an artificial island with an area of  in lake Steinhuder Meer, located in the Hanover Region, Northern Germany. The island was created in the 18th century as a fortification by Count William of Schaumburg-Lippe, ruler of this small German state. Since then the island hosts the Wilhelmstein fortress. Today the island, close to Hagenburg, is a popular destination for tourists. It can be reached by so-called 'emigrants boats' from Steinhude and Mardorf.

See also 
 In 1772 the island was the base of the first German submarine, the Steinhude Pike.

External links 

 Official web site

Islands of Lower Saxony
Artificial islands of Germany
Lake islands of Germany
Steinhuder Meer
Wunstorf